Probable cytosolic iron-sulfur protein assembly protein CIAO1 is a protein that in humans is encoded by the CIAO1 gene. CIAO1 forms a complex with FAM96B, MMS19, the co-chaperone HSC20 and the scaffold protein ISCU in order to assist iron-sulfur cluster incorporation into cytoplasmic and nuclear iron-sulfur proteins.

References

External links

Further reading